An armband is a piece of material worn around the arm. They may be worn for pure ornamentation, or to mark the wearer as belonging to group, or as insignia having a certain rank, status, office or role, or being in a particular state or condition. Sprung armbands, known as sleeve garters, have been used by men to keep overlong sleeves from dropping over the hands and thereby interfering with their use. Armbands may also refer to inflatable armbands used to assist flotation for swimmers or for use with sphygmomanometers, in which case they are generally referred to as cuffs.

Variation
Bronze Age armbands have been found made from bronze (sometimes gilded) and jet. Some were constructed so that it would have been impossible to remove them.

When used as part of a military uniform it is called a brassard. Uniforms serving other purposes such as to identify members of clubs, societies or teams may also have armbands for certain ranks or functions. An armband might identify a group leader, a team captain, or a person charged with controlling or organizing an event. 

Police departments in Asia use armbands for a "traffic reflection armband" or marking a type of unit.

Journalists in Asia use an armband to mark themselves, similar to a press badge.  

Armbands are sometimes used to indicate political affiliations or to identify the wearer with an ideology or social movement.

Large corporations sponsor athletes and teams in an effort to get advertising when the athletes exhibit the corporate logo visibly.  Armbands, headbands, handbands and wristbands are common forms of such advertising.

The phrase to wear your heart on your sleeve, meaning to show your feelings, to display an emotional affiliation or conviction, is supposedly related to armbands. In medieval jousts, ladies of the court were said to tie a piece of cloth — a scarf or kerchief — around the arm of their favorite knight, who thus displayed his affection for the lady.

Armbands are often used to hold a smartphone or a portable music player on a wearer's arm while doing activities such as lifting weights, running, etc. A hybrid type of armband and handband combination is now also widely used by runners.

Mourning

In some cultures, a black armband signifies that the wearer is in mourning or wishes to identify with the commemoration of a family member, friend, comrade or team member who has died. This use is particularly common in the first meeting following the loss of a member. President Franklin D. Roosevelt wore a black armband mourning the recent death of his mother at the time he signed the declaration of war against Japan in December 1941. In association football,  it is common for a team to wear black armbands in their next match after the death of a former player or manager. This may also be accompanied by a moment of silence at the start of the match.

The phrase "black armband view of history" was introduced to the Australian political lexicon by conservative historian Geoffrey Blainey in 1993 to describe views of history which, he believed, posited that "much of Australian history had been a disgrace" and which focused mainly on the treatment of minority groups, especially Aborigines. The term was used by Prime Minister John Howard, whose perspective on Australian history strongly contrasted with what he called the black armband view.

See also
 Arm ring
 Bracelet
 Brassard, or armlet, a piece of military uniform
 Inflatable armbands, flotation devices
 Pra Jiad
 Sleeve garter
 Tefillin

References

Fashion accessories
Clothing in politics
Armwear

Insignia